Devil's Head Lookout is a U.S. Forest Service fire lookout tower at the summit of Devils Head in Douglas County, Colorado.  Located on a large pinnacle of Pikes Peak granite, the fire lookout point lies within the Pike National Forest and is accessed by hiking the Devils Head National Recreation Trail.

The station was first established in 1912, with the original tower built in 1919.  In the summer of 1951, the old tower was dismantled and current structure was built.  In 1991, Devil's Head Lookout was added to the National Register of Historic Places.  Sitting at the highest point of Rampart Range,  the fire lookout is the last remaining such structure to be in service along the Front Range of Colorado.

The view from the current structure extends at least 100 miles in every direction on clear days.

The lookout (elev. 9748 feet, or 2971 m) can be accessed via easy/moderate trail (2.8 miles, or 4.5 km round trip) with elevation gain of 951 feet, or 290 m.  The last stretch is a climb on 143 stairs.  The access is from Rampart Range Road, a 14.5-km dirt road (easily accessible by passenger cars) from CO67.  Note that the road to the trailhead is always closed to vehicles during the winter and typically does not open until April or May.

Gallery

See also
National Register of Historic Places listings in Douglas County, Colorado

See also
Front Range
Mountain peaks of Colorado
Mountain peaks of North America
Mountain peaks of the Rocky Mountains
Mountain peaks of the United States
Mountain ranges of Colorado
Rampart Range
Southern Rocky Mountains

References

External links

Devil's Head Lookout Tower on Pike National Forest Website
Devil's Head Trailhead #611(Devil's Head National Recreation Trail) on Pike National Forest Website
National Register of Historic Places in Douglas County, Colorado

Buildings and structures in Douglas County, Colorado
Park buildings and structures on the National Register of Historic Places in Colorado
Fire lookout towers in Colorado
Fire lookout towers on the National Register of Historic Places
Pike National Forest
Rebuilt buildings and structures in the United States
1912 establishments in Colorado

Government buildings completed in 1919
Government buildings completed in 1951
National Register of Historic Places in Douglas County, Colorado